Superman ice cream is a three-flavor ice cream that usually appears in red, blue, and yellow. Although it originated in the Midwestern United States, particularly Michigan and Wisconsin, it can also be found in various ice cream parlors such as Baskin-Robbins or where Hershey's ice cream is sold across the United States.

The tricolor combination is commonly believed to be named after Superman, the DC Comics superhero character, whose costume comprises those colors, although the flavor originated before the character was created and has never been officially licensed, so some producers sell the flavor under different brand names to avoid potential legal issues.  The exact flavor mixture is not defined as well as the color scheme, and different brands often vary the flavor components used to make up the swirl.

Many of the traditional versions call for Blue Moon as the blue component of the swirl. Blue Moon has a hard-to-place flavor and, like the Superman flavor which often incorporates it, was created in the early 20th century. The Blue Moon flavor can also be found around the United States in ice cream parlors which serve Hershey's ice cream, as well as select grocery stores and gas stations.

The combination is commonly believed to have originated in Detroit, Michigan, at Stroh's Ice Cream during the Prohibition Era, but this is unconfirmed.

List of common brand and flavor combinations

See also
 List of ice cream flavors

References

External links
 

Cuisine of the Midwestern United States
Flavors of ice cream
Superman